Uniko may refer to: 

 Österreichische Universitätenkonferenz (UNIKO), Austrian academic association
 Uniko, musical recording by the Kronos Quartet